Waterloo is an eastern suburb of Lower Hutt, Wellington. It is named after the Battle of Waterloo won by the Duke of Wellington in 1815.

The Hutt City Council formally defines Waterloo as the area bounded by Waterloo Road and Burnside Street in the north, the Hutt Valley railway line in the west, Guthrie Street in the south, and the Wainuiomata hills in the east.

It is the home suburb to Waterloo Primary School and the Open Polytechnic of New Zealand. It is also home to Waterloo Interchange, a major train and bus station.

Demographics

Waterloo had a population of 5,379 at the 2018 New Zealand census, an increase of 255 people (5.0%) since the 2013 census, and an increase of 243 people (4.7%) since the 2006 census. There were 2,013 households. There were 2,598 males and 2,784 females, giving a sex ratio of 0.93 males per female, with 1,068 people (19.9%) aged under 15 years, 951 (17.7%) aged 15 to 29, 2,562 (47.6%) aged 30 to 64, and 801 (14.9%) aged 65 or older.

Ethnicities were 70.2% European/Pākehā, 10.2% Māori, 5.1% Pacific peoples, 22.2% Asian, and 2.6% other ethnicities (totals add to more than 100% since people could identify with multiple ethnicities).

The proportion of people born overseas was 29.0%, compared with 27.1% nationally.

Although some people objected to giving their religion, 48.2% had no religion, 37.1% were Christian, 5.1% were Hindu, 1.0% were Muslim, 1.3% were Buddhist and 2.5% had other religions.

Of those at least 15 years old, 1,410 (32.7%) people had a bachelor or higher degree, and 579 (13.4%) people had no formal qualifications. The employment status of those at least 15 was that 2,274 (52.7%) people were employed full-time, 603 (14.0%) were part-time, and 156 (3.6%) were unemployed.

Education

References

Suburbs of Lower Hutt